Digital Realty Trust, Inc. v. Somers, 583 U.S. ___ (2018), was a United States Supreme Court case in which the Court ruled that "whistleblower" status and associated protections as defined by Sarbanes-Oxley and Dodd-Frank only apply in cases where the whistleblower has reported malfeasance directly to the Securities and Exchange Commission.

See also
 List of United States Supreme Court cases
 List of United States Supreme Court cases, volume 583
 List of United States Supreme Court cases by the Roberts Court

References

External links
 

United States class action case law
United States Supreme Court cases
United States Supreme Court cases of the Roberts Court
2018 in United States case law
United States securities case law